Bruno Edmund Pezzey (3 February 1955 – 31 December 1994) was an Austrian professional footballer who played as a defender.

Club career
Regarded as one of Austria's greatest defenders of all time, Pezzey started his professional career at local side FC Vorarlberg and moved to FC Wacker Innsbruck after only one season, winning two league titles and a domestic cup. The sweeper then joined Eintracht Frankfurt in 1978, winning the UEFA Cup and a DFB-Pokal. Four seasons with Werder Bremen did not bring him any silverware (but runner-up to the league title twice) and he returned to Innsbruck in 1987 to win two league titles and a domestic cup again.

International career
Pezzey made his debut for Austria in June 1975 against Czechoslovakia and was a participant at the 1978 FIFA World Cup and 1982 FIFA World Cup. In the latter tournament, he scored Austria's first goal in the 2–2 draw with Northern Ireland in Madrid. He earned 84 caps, scoring nine goals, still in 2016 ranked fifth with Friedrich Koncilia in Austria's all-time appearances list. His final international appearance was an August 1990 friendly match against Switzerland.

Death and legacy
Pezzey died of heart failure in an Innsbruck hospital on New Year's Eve 1994 after participating in a game of ice hockey, just a few weeks short of his 40th birthday. He left behind his wife and two daughters. His youth club, FC Lauterach, named its sports complex in his honour.

Honours
Wacker Innsbruck
 Austrian Bundesliga: 1974–75, 1976–77
 Austrian Cup: 1974–75

Eintracht Frankfurt
 UEFA Cup: 1979–80
 DFB-Pokal: 1980–81

Swarovski Tirol
 Austrian Bundesliga: 1988–89, 1989–90
 Austrian Cup: 1988–89

References

External links
 
 
 
 Bruno Pezzey at Eintracht Archiv

1955 births
1994 deaths
People from Bregenz District
Footballers from Vorarlberg
Austrian footballers
Association football defenders
Austria international footballers
1978 FIFA World Cup players
1982 FIFA World Cup players
UEFA Cup winning players
FC Wacker Innsbruck players
Eintracht Frankfurt players
SV Werder Bremen players
Austrian Football Bundesliga players
Bundesliga players
Austrian expatriate footballers
Austrian expatriate sportspeople in West Germany
Expatriate footballers in West Germany
FC Swarovski Tirol players